The Catholic Times was the official publication of the Roman Catholic Diocese of La Crosse in La Crosse, Wisconsin.  Published bi-weekly, the newspaper had 29,000 subscribers, most of whom lived within the 19 Wisconsin counties that comprise the diocese.

Description
The newspaper's content included international, national, and local news, and commentaries on religion and other issues of interest to Catholics. A primary focus of the paper was to publish the events and activities of the people and parishes of the diocese. It published Bishop William P. Callahan's column ("The Bishop's Corner") and official diocesan decrees. For much of its international and national news, the paper relied on the Catholic News Service.

The website of The Catholic Times published articles that are too large and photographs too numerous for the paper and items that do not fit in the newspaper's publishing niche. Thus, the paper and website did not mirror each other.

Stan Gould had served as editor of The Catholic Times since 2009, Denis Downey, the associate editor since 2010 and Joseph O'Brien has been the staff writer since 2010. The Catholic Times also had five freelance reporters in the diocese.

It ceased publishing following the October 29, 2015 issue.

References

External links
Official website

Newspapers published in Wisconsin
Catholic Church in Wisconsin
Catholic newspapers published in the United States